The 5000 metres at the World Championships in Athletics has been contested by men since the inaugural edition in 1983 and by women since 1995. Women competed over 3000 metres from 1980 to 1993, in line with championship standards of the time. It is the shortest long-distance running event at the competition, the 10,000 metres and marathon being the other two such events on the programme. It is the second most prestigious title in the discipline after the 5000 metres at the Olympics. The competition format typically has a two-race heats stage that leads directly to a final between fifteen athletes.

The championship records for the event are 12:52.79 minutes for men, set by Eliud Kipchoge in 2003, and 14:26.72 minutes for women, set by Hellen Obiri in 2019. The world record has never been broken or equalled at the competition by either men or women, reflecting the lack of pacemaking and athletes' more tactical approach to championship races. Similarly the women's 3000 metres world record was not improved during its 13-year history. The championship record for that event was set on its last appearance in 1993, by Yunxia Qu with a time of 8:28.71 minutes.

The women's 3000 m was among the first ever IAAF World Championship events as it was one of two designated events at the 1980 World Championships in Athletics (alongside women's 400 metres hurdles), which was held after the International Olympic Committee refused to add the women's event to the Olympic programme that year.

Mo Farah of Great Britain is the only athlete to win this title three times, between 2011 and 2015. Meseret Defar is the most successful female athlete of the event, having won two world championship titles and reached the medal podium five times consecutively from 2005 to 2013. Vivian Cheruiyot is the next most successful with two golds and one silver. Three other athletes have won the 5000 m championship twice: Ismael Kirui on the men's side, and Gabriela Szabo and Tirunesh Dibaba on the women's side. Tatyana Dorovskikh was also a double champion in the women's 3000 m, and the only woman to win multiple medals over that distance.

Kenya is the most successful nation in the discipline, with seven wins in the men's distance and two in the women's, and has the highest medal total at 21. Ethiopia is the next best performer with four women's titles, one men's title and twenty medal overall. Morocco, Great Britain, Romania and Ireland are the other nations to have won multiple gold medals in the 5000 m. The Soviet Union won the most 3000 m medals during its run, with two titles and four medals. China produced a medal sweep in 1993.
Eamonn Coghlan and Jakob Ingebrigtsen are the only non-African-born men to win the 5000 m.

Age
All information from IAAF

Doping
The World Championship 5000 metres was unaffected by doping until the 2001, when men's silver medallist Ali Saïdi-Sief of Algeria failed his post-race urine test due to nandrolone traces. He was stripped of his medal. Only one other competitor has been disqualified from the 5000 m for doping: Turkey's Alemitu Bekele Degfa, whose unsuccessful run in the heats in 2011 was annulled retrospectively after biological passport irregularities.

Among those failing tests outside the competition was 1983 men's bronze medallist Martti Vainio, who admitted to using testosterone supplements and failed a test for steroids in 1984. Marta Domínguez, the women's runner-up in 2001 and 2003, was banned later in her career for abnormalities in her biological passport readings. In the women's 3000 m, no athletes were banned during World Championships competition but 1983 medallist Tatyana Kazankina ended her career in 1984 by refusing a drug test, while the 1987 and 1991 world champion for the distance Tetyana Dorovskikh also ended her career with a drugs ban in 1993. The 1983 women's champion Mary Decker was another banned for doping later in her career.

Medalists

Men

Multiple medalists

Medalists by country

Women's 5000 metres

Multiple medalists

Medalists by country

Women's 3000 metres

Multiple medalists

Medalists by country

Championship record progression

Men

Women 5000 metres

Women 3000 metres

References

Bibliography

External links
Official IAAF website

 
World Championships in Athletics
Events at the World Athletics Championships